Eileen Fisher (October 4, 1950) is an American fashion designer and entrepreneur. She is the founder of the women's clothing brand Eileen Fisher Inc.

Biography 
Fisher grew up in Des Plaines, Illinois, the second of the seven children. When Fisher decided to go to college, her father explained that the family could not contribute to her tuition because they needed to save their money to send her younger brother to college as "he would need an education to support his family some day." Fisher explained in an interview to Inc. in 2013: "It didn't upset me — it was the times. I never expected a penny from my parents. I payed all my tuition fees from University of Illinoisby working as a waitress." She started as a math major before switching to interior design, graduating in 1972. Fisher then moved to New York City in 1973.   She worked as an interior designer and as a graphic artist before establishing her own fashion business inspired by style and longevity of the classic kimono. She has two children, Zackary and Sasha, with her ex-husband David Zweibel, and lives in Irvington, New York.

Company 

Eileen Fisher Inc. is an American privately held company founded by Fisher in 1984 with $350 in startup money. Her first order at a New York clothing design show was for $3,000, which was followed three months later with $40,000 in additional sales. She opened her first retail store in 1986, on East 9th Street in Manhattan.

In 2002, the company earned $144 million in revenue, and $154 million in 2003. Estimated revenue in 2015 grew to over $300 million.  As of 2003, 35 percent of the company's clothing was manufactured in the United States while the rest was made in China in compliance with Social Accountability International's SA8000.

The company has over 1200 employees  with over 56 retail stores in fifteen states.

In 2011, the company expanded outside the U.S., opening its first Canadian store in Vancouver, British Columbia and then more stores in London, England, in October 2012. Since its formation, the company has extended its distribution to over 1,000 wholesale doors and 68 retail stores.

In order to reduce fabric and fiber waste, the company started a recycling program. Customers donate their "gently used" Eileen Fisher clothing in return for a $5 gift certificate per article. After dry cleaning, the garments are resold—with the income funding business grants for women and leadership programs for young women.

See also

 List of fashion designers
 List of people from New York City
 List of University of Illinois at Urbana–Champaign people
 List of New York companies

References

External links 
 
  (profile on the person)
 How I Build This - Eileen Fisher: Eileen Fisher (audio interview)

20th-century American businesspeople
20th-century American businesswomen
21st-century American businesspeople
American company founders
American fashion businesspeople
American fashion designers
American women fashion designers
American women business executives
Businesspeople from New York City
People from Irvington, New York
People from Des Plaines, Illinois
University of Illinois Urbana-Champaign alumni

1984 establishments in the United States
Clothing retailers of the United States
Privately held companies based in New York (state)
Retail companies established in 1984
Companies based in Westchester County, New York
Living people
1950 births
Place of birth missing (living people)
B Lab-certified corporations
21st-century American businesswomen
American women company founders